Yannick Loemba (born 21 April 1990) is a Congolese footballer, who currently plays for RFC Liège in the Belgian National Division 1.

Club career
Loemba signed a two-year contract with Dundee United in July 2018. Having made ten appearances in the early part of the 2018-19 season, he rarely featured after Robbie Neilson replaced Csaba László as manager and was released by the club in July 2019.

International career
Loemba was born in the Republic of the Congo, and moved to Belgium when he was eight years old. He appeared for the Congo U23s for a friendly against Morocco U23s.

References

External links

1990 births
Living people
Republic of the Congo footballers
Belgian footballers
Belgian people of Republic of the Congo descent
Belgian sportspeople of African descent
Black Belgian sportspeople
RWS Bruxelles players
R.A.E.C. Mons players
K.V. Oostende players
Oud-Heverlee Leuven players
Adana Demirspor footballers
RFC Liège players
Belgian Pro League players
Challenger Pro League players
Place of birth missing (living people)
Association football defenders
Expatriate footballers in Turkey
Dundee United F.C. players
Expatriate footballers in Scotland
Scottish Professional Football League players